The following is the discography of Doug E. Fresh, an American rapper.

Albums

Studio albums

Singles

As lead artist 
 "Superstition" [1997, Hollywood] (with the Get Fresh Crew)
 "Left-Right" (2007, Entertaining Music) (featuring Square Off)

As lead artist

Singles with unknown release date
Come Again/I Can Make U Dance, New York DJ Service
Who Run This (featuring Busy Bee & Lovebug Starski), Self-released

B-sides

Guest Appearances
 "We Not Giving Up" (2005, The Xtatik Experience) (featuring Doug E Fresh and Machel Montano)
 "You'll Never Know" (2005, E-Z Rollers) (featuring Doug E. Fresh & Sharon Brown)
 "Rhyme & Punishment" (2005, E-Z Rollers) (featuring Doug E. Fresh) [Distorted Minds Remix]
 "Rhyme & Punishment" (2005, E-Z Rollers) (featuring Doug E. Fresh)
 "Virgo" (2005) (with Ludacris and Nas)
 "Ready" (2017) (with Bell Biv DeVoe)

References

Notes

Citations

Discographies of American artists
Hip hop discographies